Christopher Gerald Uhlmann (born 24 June 1960) is an Australian former journalist and television presenter.

Career
Uhlmann was formerly a seminarian, a security guard, and a journalist with The Canberra Times before joining the Australian Broadcasting Corporation as a radio producer in 1998.

From 1999 to 2004, Uhlmann co-hosted Local Radio Breakfast on 666 ABC Canberra with David Kilby. In 2005, he was Jon Faine's producer for the Mornings show on 774 ABC Melbourne, and in 2006 was made chief political correspondent for ABC Radio current affairs.

In 2008, Uhlmann switched to television, and was political editor for The 7.30 Report, ABC News, and ABC News channel. In December 2010, he was appointed as co-host of the ABC Television current affairs program, 7.30. In 2012, the show was revamped again, with Uhlmann returning to the political editor role, and Leigh Sales hosting the program.

In 2013, Uhlmann stepped down as 7.30 political editor. He announced that he would be working on a documentary about the Rudd and Gillard Governments for the ABC.

In February 2014, Uhlmann became the 14th presenter of AM, the ABC Radio news and current affairs program. He took over after Tony Eastley resigned to take up a senior presenter role with the ABC News channel.

In January 2015, Uhlmann was appointed in a newly-created position as ABC News political editor. As a result of the new position Uhlmann left his role as presenter of AM, and was replaced by Michael Brissenden.

In July 2017, Uhlmann's 2-minute report for ABC's Insiders on Donald Trump's appearance at the 2017 G20 Hamburg summit went viral, and he was interviewed extensively in the United States, on various television networks.

In August 2017, Uhlmann announced that he would be leaving the ABC to join Nine News as political editor, replacing Laurie Oakes.

In August 2018, amid the 2018 Liberal Party leadership spill, Uhlmann gained popularity again
on social media when he appeared on Today, where he stated that the Sky News television channel, 2GB radio station and News Corp were "waging a war" against Prime Minister of Australia Malcolm Turnbull. When asked how he expected presenters on Sky or 2GB to respond, he said he "couldn't give a rat's arse", adding "If you dish it out, you have to be prepared to take it".

Awards
2008: Walkley Award for Broadcast Interviewing

Politics
Uhlmann unsuccessfully contested the ACT 1998 general election for the electorate of Molonglo with the Osborne Independent Group. 
The conservative group was named after Paul Osborne, who strongly opposed abortion care and advocated blocking both euthanasia legislation and any attempt to decriminalise abortion. Osborne and Uhlmann fell out when Osborne moved to severely restrict abortion in the ACT. Six years earlier, Uhlmann had written in support of establishing an abortion clinic in the territory.

Books
With Steve Lewis, Uhlmann has written a series of political novels set in Canberra: The Marmalade Files (2012), The Mandarin Code (2014) and The Shadow Game (2016). These feature a political reporter, Harry  Dunkley,  investigating a conspiracy involving China, the US and Australian security organisations. In 2016 the first two books were adapted as the Australian television series Secret City, and Harry became Harriet.

Personal life
Uhlmann is married to Gai Brodtmann who was an Australian Labor Party member of the House of Representatives for the Division of Canberra from 2010 to 2019. Gai is also a member of the Australian Strategic Policy Institute (ASPI) council, which is a partly Defence Industry and Defence Ministry funded think tank.

References

External links

1960 births
Living people
Australian television journalists
ABC News (Australia) presenters
ABC radio (Australia) journalists and presenters
Australian radio producers
Australian people of German descent
Walkley Award winners
Australian television talk show hosts